William Scott Scudder (born February 14, 1968) is a former Major League Baseball  right-handed pitcher.

Drafted by the Cincinnati Reds in the 1st round of the 1986 MLB amateur draft, Scudder made his Major League Baseball debut with the Cincinnati Reds on June 6, 1989, and appeared in his final game on May 22, 1993.

On May 20, 1988, Scudder pitched a no-hitter for the Cedar Rapids Reds against the Wausau Timbers.

Scudder was a member of the Cincinnati Reds team that defeated the Oakland Athletics in the 1990 World Series. He pitched scoreless innings in both the NLCS against the Pittsburgh Pirates and in the World Series against Oakland.

Though mainly a starter during his career, Scudder did pick up one save. On April 17, 1991, Scudder pitched 3 shutout innings to close out a 5-1 victory over the Padres.

On February 1, 2010, Scudder was announced as a new coach at Team Sweden along with Dennis Cook.

References

External links
, or Retrosheet
Pura Pelota (Venezuelan Winter League)

1968 births
Living people
Baseball players from Texas
Billings Mustangs players
Buffalo Bisons (minor league) players
Cedar Rapids Reds players
Charlotte Knights players
Chattanooga Lookouts players
Cincinnati Reds players
Cleveland Indians players
Colorado Springs Sky Sox players
Indianapolis Indians players
Major League Baseball pitchers
Nashville Sounds players
People from Paris, Texas
Tigres de Aragua players
American expatriate baseball players in Venezuela